Tatyana Dmitriyevna Gubina (Татьяна Дмитриевна Губина, born 15 December 1977) is a Kazakhstani female water polo player. She was a member of the Kazakhstan women's national water polo team, playing as a centre back. 

She was a part of the  team at the 2000 Summer Olympics and 2004 Summer Olympics. On club level she played for Eurasia Rakhat in Kazakhstan.

References

External links
http://www.thefanatics.com/sports.news.view.php?id=33041804
http://www.zimbio.com/photos/Tatyana+Gubina
http://www.gettyimages.com/photos/tatyana-gubina?excludenudity=true&sort=mostpopular&mediatype=photography&phrase=tatyana%20gubina

1977 births
Living people
Kazakhstani female water polo players
Water polo players at the 2004 Summer Olympics
Olympic water polo players of Kazakhstan
People from Temirtau
Water polo players at the 2000 Summer Olympics
21st-century Kazakhstani women